Kaligandaki is a Village council in Syangja District in Gandaki Province, central Nepal. On 12 March 2017, the government of Nepal implemented a new local administrative structure consisting of 744 local units. With the implementation of the new local administrative structure, VDCs have been replaced with municipal & village councils. Kaligandaki is one of these 744 local units. Kaligandaki is created by merging Alamdevi, Birgha Archale, Chandibhanjyang & Shreekrishna Gandaki.

Political situation
Kaligandaki is divided into 7 Wards. It is surrounded by Galyang Municipality, Kaligandaki Rural Municipality, Gulmi, and Satyawati Rural Municipality at northern side, Galyang Municipality from east, Tansen Municipality from west and Tansen Municipality and Bagnaskali Rural Municipality at south. Birgha Archale is its headquarter.

Population
As Kaligandaki is created by merging Alamdevi, Birgha Archale, Chandibhanjyang & Shreekrishna Gandaki. The total population of Kaligandaki, 21,728, is residing in an area of 73.51 km2.

References

See also

Rural municipalities in Syangja District
Syangja District
Rural municipalities of Nepal established in 2017